Nirmal Singh is an Indian politician who represented the Shutrana Assembly constituency in the Punjab Legislative Assembly between 2017 and 2022. He is a member of the Indian National Congress. He was elected as the MLA in the 2017 Punjab Legislative Assembly election.

Member of Legislative Assembly
Singh represented the Shutrana Assembly constituency between 2017 and 2022 after winning the election.

In the 2022 Punjab Legislative Assembly election he contested from Shutrana as a member of the Indian National Congress and was defeated by Aam Aadmi Party's candidate Kulwant Singh Bazigar by a large margin.

References

External links
 
 

Living people
Punjab, India MLAs 2017–2022
Indian National Congress politicians from Punjab, India
People from Patiala district
Year of birth missing (living people)